Chiang Yung-Ning (1927 – 16 May 1968, also known as Jiang Yongning), was a Hong Kong international table tennis player who represented China.

Table tennis career
He won three bronze medals at the 1956 World Table Tennis Championships, 1957 World Table Tennis Championships and 1959 World Table Tennis Championships in the Swaythling Cup (men's team event) for China.

He was the first National table tennis champion of China in 1952 and in 1953 defeated the defending World Champion Johnny Leach.

Death
Chiang was the victim of harassment and torture during the Cultural Revolution in China. He and fellow table tennis stars Fu Chi Fong and Yong Guotang were accused of being capitalist spies simply because of their Hong Kong origin. Chiang liked to read newspapers in his spare time, which led to accusations by the rebels that he was collecting information for the capitalists and Japanese. After being forced into a confession, he committed suicide on May 16 1968 Chi Fong and Yong Guaotang were also forced into suicide by the same public harassment and torture.

See also
 List of table tennis players
 List of World Table Tennis Championships medalists

References

Chinese male table tennis players
Hong Kong male table tennis players
Suicides during the Cultural Revolution
1968 deaths
1927 births
World Table Tennis Championships medalists